Jörg Fauser (16 July 1944 in Bad Schwalbach – 17 July 1987 in Munich) was a German writer, poet and journalist.

The influence of the American beat generation literature on his works is well known. Together with Carl Weissner and other colleagues he published several issues of the literature magazine Gasolin 23 which included work by William S. Burroughs, Allen Ginsberg and the first German translations of short stories by Charles Bukowski. His later works are mostly German detective stories. "Der Schneemann" has been made into . He died when a truck hit him while walking on a motorway near Munich. Fauser's autobiographical novel, Rohstoff, a cutting look at the German counter-culture scene of the late 1960s and early 1970s, has been translated into English by Jamie Bulloch as Raw Material and published by Clerkenwell Press. His radio play Für eine Mark und Acht was adapted into the 1998 film Frankfurt Millennium.

Works
 Aqualunge, Göttingen 1971
 Tophane, Gersthofen 1972
 Die Harry-Gelb-Story, Gersthofen 1973
 Open end, München 1977
 Marlon Brando – der versilberte Rebell, München 1978
 Der Strand der Städte, Berlin 1978
 Alles wird gut, München 1979
 Requiem für einen Goldfisch, Basel 1979
 Trotzki, Goethe und das Glück, München 1979
 Der Schneemann, München 1981
 Mann und Maus, München 1982
 Blues für Blondinen, Frankfurt/M. 1984
 Rohstoff, Frankfur/M. 1984
 Das Schlangenmaul, Frankfurt/M. 1985
 Kant, München 1987
 Jörg-Fauser-Edition, Hamburg
Bd. 1. Romane I, 1990
Bd. 2. Romane II, 1990
Bd. 3. Erzählungen I, 1990
Bd. 4. Erzählungen II, 1990
Bd. 5. Gedichte, 1990
Bd. 6. Essays, Reportagen, Kolumnen I, 1990
Bd. 7. Essays, Reportagen, Kolumnen II, 1990
Bd. 8. Marlon-Brando-Biographie, 1990
Beiheft. Informationen und Bilder, 1990
Erg.-Bd. Das leise lächelnde Nein und andere Texte, 1994
 Blues in Blond, Hamburg 1992
 "Ich habe eine Mordswut", Frankfurt/M. 1993
 Lese-Stoff, Frankfurt/M. 2003

References

1944 births
1987 deaths
People from Bad Schwalbach
Burials at the Ostfriedhof (Munich)
German-language poets
German male poets